New Art/Science Affinities (NA/SA) is a book, while focusing on contemporary artists, also alludes to those in .edu Art Departments-nationwide; where all are working globally at the intersection of art, science, and technology co-published by Miller Gallery at Carnegie Mellon University and STUDIO for Creative Inquiry.  It focuses on sixty international artists and art collaboratives.  The book is accompanied by an exhibition titled Intimate Science, first shown at Miller Gallery at Carnegie Mellon University in January 2012.

Creation
New Art/Science Affinities was designed and written at the Frank-Ratchye STUDIO for Creative Inquiry on Carnegie Mellon University's campus in February 2011. The book was created through a working model for collaborative book authorship known as a book sprint, derived from code sprinting.  The project was led by Andrea Grover, recipient of a 2010 Warhol Foundation Curatorial Fellowship, along with three other authors (Régine Debatty, Claire L. Evans and Pablo Garcia) and two designers (Luke Bulman and Jessica Young of Thumb).

"As a ‘snapshot’ created on the run over seven days, it necessarily portrays a quite particular moment and choice."  The publication is not a complete history of the interstices of art, technology, and science, although there is a timeline in the back marking some of the most important events in history including the 1968 exhibition of computer art titled Cybernetic Serendipity at the Institute of Contemporary Arts, London.

Content and featured artists
A common theme that emerges in New Art/Science Affinities is concern for the environment. It’s interesting to note that although four of the book’s six creators are women, male artists outnumber female artists in the book.

Andrea Grover, writes about her discovery while writing the book, "We observed that artists are no longer operating on the periphery of research but conducting research themselves. And when artists become scientists, the lines of inquiry pursued become quite expansive."

The book is divided into 6 chapters with an additional timeline of Art, Science & Technology Intersections.  The chapters are:

References

External links
 NA/SA book page (download)

2011 books